Chimborazo is a volcano in Ecuador.

Chimborazo can also refer to:
 Chimborazo Hospital, American Civil War hospital
 Chimborazo Province, Ecuador
 Battle of Chimborazo, c. 1531, during civil war in Incan Empire
 Chimborazo (Barbados), high point of Saint Joseph, Barbados
 Chimborazo Park, in Richmond, Virginia
 Chimborazo, Virginia